Interstate 78 (I-78) is an east–west route stretching from Union Township, Lebanon County, Pennsylvania, to New York City. In New Jersey, I-78 is called the Phillipsburg–Newark Expressway and the Newark Bay–Hudson County Extension of the New Jersey Turnpike. The Phillipsburg–Newark Expressway portion of I-78, formally called the Lightning Division Memorial Highway, runs from the Phillipsburg area east across rural areas of western New Jersey before entering suburban areas in Somerset County. The road crosses the Watchung Mountains, widening into a local–express lane configuration at Route 24 as it continues through urban areas to Newark. Here, I-78 intersects the mainline of the New Jersey Turnpike (I-95) and becomes the Newark Bay Extension, crossing the Newark Bay Bridge and continuing to Jersey City. The route, along with Route 139, follows a one-way pair of surface streets to the Holland Tunnel.

In 1927, Route 11 was legislated as a high-speed bypass of US Route 22 (US 22) between Whitehouse and Warren Township but was never built. The earliest parts of I-78 to be built were the Holland Tunnel in 1927 and the Newark Bay Extension. With the creation of the Interstate Highway System in the 1950s, a highway was planned along US 22 through northern New Jersey, becoming I-78 in 1958. The highway between Phillipsburg and Newark was built in various stages from the 1960s to 1989, with the final segment opening at the I-78 Toll Bridge. The section of highway through the Watchung Mountains and across Newark garnered opposition from environmentalists and residents who were worried about the effects of the highway. In addition, there was opposition to building I-78 through Phillipsburg, which resulted in the alignment to the south of the Lehigh Valley. In the 2000s, I-78 was completely rebuilt between Route 24 and the Garden State Parkway. In addition, missing movements between the parkway and I-78 were completed in 2010.

Route description

Warren and Hunterdon counties
I-78 enters New Jersey from Pennsylvania on the I-78 Toll Bridge over the Delaware River and the Belvidere and Delaware River Railway, heading into Phillipsburg, Warren County. The highway heads south into agricultural areas as a six-lane freeway that is maintained by the Delaware River Joint Toll Bridge Commission (DRJTBC), entering Pohatcong Township a short distance after the river. The freeway makes a turn to the east as it briefly passes through a corner of Alpha before coming back into Pohatcong Township. Bypassing the center of Alpha to the south, I-78 passes under Norfolk Southern Railway's Lehigh Line and has two more segments that enter the Alpha borough limits before coming to an interchange with US 22 and the western terminus of Route 173. At this point, US 22 forms a concurrency with I-78 and the road comes into Greenwich Township. At this point, the New Jersey Department of Transportation (NJDOT) takes over maintenance of the road. I-78/US 22 continue east through Greenwich Township, coming to a westbound exit and eastbound entrance with County Route 637 (CR 637). The road turns southeast and has an eastbound exit and westbound entrance with CR 632 in Franklin Township. Within the ramps for this interchange, there are weigh stations in both directions.

A short distance after this interchange, I-78/US 22 crosses the Musconetcong River into Bloomsbury, Hunterdon County. In Bloomsbury, the road has an interchange with Route 173. After this interchange, the freeway enters Bethlehem Township, with Route 173 closely running to the north of I-78/ US22. The road comes to a bridge over Norfolk Southern Railway's Central Running Track line and has rest areas in both directions before it passes over Norfolk Southern Railway's Lehigh Line and turns southeast to cross Musconetcong Mountain. As the freeway crosses Jugtown Mountain, there is an automatic deicing spray, the first such to be installed in New Jersey.

The freeway turns east again and enters Union Township, coming to an interchange with CR 614 and Route 173. From here, I-78/US 22 continue east directly to the south of Route 173, coming to another interchange with that route as well as CR 625. Entering more commercial areas, Route 173 merges onto I-78/US 22 at exit 13. At exit 15, the highway interchanges with CR 513, and Route 173 splits from I-78/US 22 by heading north on CR 513. At this point, the freeway enters Franklin Township briefly at exit 15 and then enters Clinton where it crosses the South Branch Raritan River. I-78/US 22 turns northeast and leaves Clinton for Clinton Township, where it has an eastbound exit and westbound entrance for Route 173 that also provides access to Route 31. Immediately after is the interchange with Route 31. At the next interchange near the community of Annandale, US 22 splits from I-78 onto a four-lane surface highway, heading closely to the south of that route.

Immediately after the split, I-78 passes over NJ Transit's Raritan Valley Line and runs through rural areas with increasing suburban development. The freeway runs through Lebanon, where an exit for CR 639 provides access to the town and the Round Valley Recreation Area. After running through Clinton Township again and into Readington Township, US 22 turns southeast while I-78 continues a due east course. In Tewksbury Township, there is an interchange with CR 523 that also provides access to CR 517. After this exit, the highway crosses back into Readington Township.

Somerset and Union counties

After crossing the Lamington River, I-78 comes into Bedminster, Somerset County, continuing east through more woods and farms with some suburban residential areas. Upon entering Somerset County, there is an exit for CR 665 (signed as CR 523 Spur). The next interchange, exit 29, is called the Vincent R. Kramer Interchange. It is at I-287, which serves as a bypass around New York City. At this point, I-78 carries four eastbound lanes and three westbound lanes as the median widens. The road enters wooded suburban areas and crosses Second Watchung Mountain, running through a corner of Bridgewater Township, where there is a westbound scenic overlook, before coming into Bernards Township. The eastbound direction narrows back to three lanes before the interchange with CR 525, at which point the freeway crosses into Warren Township. The road heads east along the southern bank of the Dead River, coming to exit 36 for CR 651. I-78 heads farther south of the Dead River as it comes to the CR 531 interchange. Past CR 531, the highway turns to the northeast and comes to an interchange with Drift Road/Dale Road that provides access to US 22. At this point, I-78 runs across Second Watchung Mountain again.

The freeway crosses Green Brook into Berkeley Heights, Union County, reaching exits for CR 655 and CR 640. The latter is an eastbound exit and entrance that also provides access to parallel CR 527. At this point, I-78 runs between Second Watchung Mountain to the northwest and the Watchung Reservation to the southeast. Along the reservation border, the road passes under Nikesite Road before coming into Summit, where there is an overpass that serves as a wildlife crossing. There is an eastbound exit and westbound entrance with CR 527 as it heads away from the Watchung Reservation and into more suburban surroundings. It briefly forming the border between Summit to the northwest and Mountainside to the southeast  before coming into Springfield Township. The freeway passes near First Watchung Mountain before coming to the Route 24 interchange, where suburban development becomes more dense.

At Route 24, I-78 divides into local–express lanes, with three express and three local lanes eastbound and two express and three local lanes westbound. In this section of the highway, most access is via the local lanes, though the next exit for Route 124 includes a direct westbound onramp to the express lanes. Before Route 124, I-78 briefly runs east through Millburn in Essex County and Springfield Township again before entering Union Township at the interchange. Past Route 124, I-78 carries a 3-2-2-3–lane configuration and comes to partial interchanges with CR 630 and CR 633. The next interchange along the highway provides access to the Garden State Parkway along the border of Union Township and Hillside. The road turns northeast again into Hillside, heading into more urbanized settings. In Hillside, I-78 passes under Conrail Shared Assets Operations' (CSAO) Irvington Industrial Track line and has an eastbound exit and westbound entrance to Winans Avenue.

Essex and Hudson counties
I-78 briefly passes through a corner of Irvington in Essex County before continuing into Newark. Upon entering Newark, the road has an interchange serving CR 602 and Wainwright Street. Following this, the freeway passes near urban neighborhoods before coming to exit 56. This large semi-directional T interchange was originally meant to serve the unbuilt Route 75, which would have connected to I-280. The large flyover ramps constructed were converted to exit ramps to Irvine Turner Boulevard with full access to the local and express lanes. Past this, the roadway passes over CSAO's Lehigh Line (which also carries NJ Transit's Raritan Valley Line), Route 27, and Amtrak's Northeast Corridor. The final interchange on the free part of I-78 is the massive complex to the north of the Newark Liberty International Airport, called the Newark Airport Interchange, with ramps to and from US 1/9, US 22, Route 21, and many local roads. Several ramps provide access to the express lanes. Just to the east, the local and express lanes rejoin at the toll gate for the New Jersey Turnpike, at which point I-78 becomes maintained by the New Jersey Turnpike Authority (NJTA), following the Newark Bay Extension of the New Jersey Turnpike. An interchange just beyond the toll booth provides full access to I-95, the mainline of the New Jersey Turnpike. I-78 here becomes a four-lane highway, heading over the New Jersey Turnpike and CSAO's Chemical Coast Secondary and Corbin Street Lead lines before passing by the Port Newark–Elizabeth Marine Terminal.

I-78 crosses the Newark Bay on the Newark Bay Bridge into Bayonne, Hudson County. As it enters Jersey City, exit 14A, numbered as part of the New Jersey Turnpike, provides access to Route 440. Within this interchange, the road passes over CSAO's Bayonne Industrial Track and Greenville Industrial Track lines. From here, the freeway turns northeast on an elevated alignment and passes industrial areas of Jersey City, with CSAO's National Docks Branch line parallel to the northwest. The next interchange, exit 14B, is for Bayview Avenue and provides access to Liberty State Park. After this interchange, I-78 comes to exit 14C, the number given to the toll plaza at the end of the turnpike extension. After the toll plaza, there is an exit for a park and ride lot at the Liberty State Park station along NJ Transit's Hudson–Bergen Light Rail line. Continuing north, the road passes over the Hudson–Bergen Light Rail line before there is an exit for Columbus Drive and Montgomery Street. Past this interchange, the highway crosses PATH's Newark–World Trade Center line. I-78 heads down to surface level and passes over CSAO's National Docks Branch line twice before it merges with the Route 139 freeway.

From here, I-78 and Route 139 pass through business areas as a one-way pair that follows six-lane 12th Street eastbound and six-lane 14th Street westbound. This segment of the route is under the jurisdiction of the Port Authority of New York and New Jersey (PANYNJ) and is also known as Boyle Plaza. It runs on surface streets with traffic lights, an example of a non–limited-access section of Interstate Highway. The first intersection is with Jersey Avenue, which heads to Downtown Jersey City and Hoboken. It intersects with the one-way northbound CR 633 (Erie Street) next before crossing one-way southbound CR 635 (Grove Street). After Grove Street, the road crosses CR 637 (Luis Muñoz Marín Boulevard) near Newport Centre just to the south. Past this intersection, the eastbound direction comes to the toll plaza for the Holland Tunnel. From here, the concurrency enters the Holland Tunnel under the Hudson River, which carries two lanes in each direction. Route 139 ends at the New Jersey–New York state line within the tunnel and I-78 continues into the New York City borough of Manhattan.

History
The oldest section of I-78, the Holland Tunnel, was established in September 1927. The tunnel predated the Interstate Highway System, as a commuter route linking Jersey City and Manhattan. Six months after it was opened, 3.66 million passengers had used the tunnel. In 1927, Route 11 had been legislated as a high-speed bypass of US 22, running from Route 28 in Whitehouse east to Route 29 in Warren Township, roughly following the alignment of present-day I-78; it was never built.

The Newark Bay Extension of the New Jersey Turnpike was the first limited-access section of I-78 to be built in the state of New Jersey. At this time, the Interstate Highway System was established and a route was planned to run east–west from the Harrisburg, Pennsylvania, area to New York City, running across the northern part of New Jersey from Phillipsburg to Jersey City along the US 22 corridor. This freeway was originally planned as FAI Corridor 102 and I-80 before it became I-78 in 1958.

The part of I-78 between exit 3 and exit 13 opened in the 1960s; this segment runs concurrent with US 22 with the old alignment of US 22 becoming Route 173. In building the road between CR 614 and exit 13, the eastbound lanes of US 22 became westbound I-78 and the westbound lanes of US 22 became the Route 173 frontage road. By 1969, I-78 had also been completed between exit 13 and CR 525. In July 1963, New Jersey Governor Richard J. Hughes approved a plan to build I-78 through the city of Newark at a cost of $205 million (equivalent to $ in ). This plan had been opposed by several communities along the route. The section of I-78 between Route 24 and the New Jersey Turnpike was completed in the mid-1970s. Along this stretch, exit 56 was to connect to the proposed Route 75 freeway, which was never built.

The section of freeway between CR 525 and Drift Road (exit 41) in Watchung was completed in 1974. The section from Drift Road to Route 24 (exit 48) in Springfield Township was delayed because of environmental impacts to the Watchung Reservation. In order to mitigate opposition to the original plan, that was shifted closer to the northern edge of the Reservation, which required extensive cuts into the Second Watchung Mountain. Extra land was added to the Nikesite Road overpass and a separate elevated wildlife crossing was built to allow for animal migration. The road was also designed to use a narrower right-of-way with no median strip and just a Jersey barrier dividing the highway, to minimize the amount of rock to be removed. This stretch of I-78 opened in 1986.

A section of I-78 in Newark was closed off in August 1989 when a debris pile under a bridge caught fire and damaged the elevated highway. The road was opened nine days after the fire occurred. The westernmost section of I-78 in New Jersey opened in November 1989 after a more northerly alignment along present day US 22 through Phillipsburg was rejected due to community opposition. This led to I-78 being rerouted to the south of the Lehigh Valley in Pennsylvania and New Jersey. The additional length of roadway that resulted from this rerouting is the reason exit numbers 3 through 52 (which were assigned before this westernmost section opened) are mismatched by approximately  when compared to their corresponding milemarker.

I-78, like many other highways in New Jersey, once had solar powered emergency callboxes every , however, with the advent of cellphones, the usage of these callboxes became extremely limited. To save on maintenance costs, the NJDOT removed these call boxes in 2005.

In 2006–2007 the highway between Route 24 (exit 48) and the Garden State Parkway (exit 52) was rebuilt. This included redecking of bridge decks and covering the deteriorated concrete pavement with an asphalt overlay. Exit 52 was reconstructed due to missing ramps from the Garden State Parkway and I-78 since the I-278 connection was canceled. Construction began in June 2008, with the ramp from the northbound Garden State Parkway to westbound I-78 being completed in September 2009. The connection between the southbound Garden State Parkway and eastbound I-78 was completed in December 2010. In 2012–2013, the deteriorating concrete surface of I-78 between the Garden State Parkway (exit 52) and US 1/9 and US 22 (exit 57) was resurfaced with an asphalt overlay; this had been the last section of I-78 within New Jersey that was still concrete.

In the early 2020s, the NJTA announced plans to widen its section of I-78, between I-95 and Jersey City, from four to six lanes. Preliminary studies for the project began in 2021; at the time, the project was slated to begin in 2023 and be complete in 2026. The project faced significant opposition from residents of neighboring communities. The project, originally budgeted at $4.7 billion, had increased to $10.6 billion by late 2022.

Exit list

See also

References

External links

I-78 in New Jersey Exits
Photos of Interstate 78 at New Jersey Roads
Speed Limits for New Jersey State Roads: Interstate 78
A history of the building of I-78 in NJ
I-78 (Greater New York Roads)

 New Jersey
78
Transportation in Warren County, New Jersey
Transportation in Hunterdon County, New Jersey
Transportation in Somerset County, New Jersey
Transportation in Union County, New Jersey
Transportation in Essex County, New Jersey
Transportation in Hudson County, New Jersey
New Jersey Turnpike
Holland Tunnel